Arthur Hiller,  (November 22, 1923 – August 17, 2016) was a Canadian-American television and film director with over 33 films to his credit during a 50-year career. He began his career directing television in Canada and later in the U.S. By the late 1950s he began directing films, most often comedies. He also directed dramas and romantic subjects, such as Love Story (1970), which was nominated for seven Oscars.

Hiller collaborated on films with screenwriters Paddy Chayefsky and Neil Simon. Among his other films were The Americanization of Emily (1964), Tobruk (1967), The Hospital (1971), The Out-of-Towners (1970), Plaza Suite (1971), The Man in the Glass Booth (1975), Silver Streak (1976), The In-Laws (1979) and Outrageous Fortune (1987).

Hiller served as president of the Directors Guild of America from 1989 to 1993 and president of the Academy of Motion Picture Arts and Sciences from 1993 to 1997. He was the recipient of the Jean Hersholt Humanitarian Award in 2002. An annual film festival in Hiller's honor was held from 2006 until 2009 at his alma mater, Victoria School of Performing and Visual Arts.

Early life and military service
Hiller was born in November 1923 in Edmonton, Alberta, the son of Rose (Garfin) and Harry Hiller. His family was Jewish, and had emigrated from Poland in 1912. He had two sisters, one thirteen years older and one eleven years older. His father operated a second-hand musical instruments store in Edmonton. Hiller recalled that when he occasionally traveled home while he was in college, the black people he met with "treated me like a king. Why? Because they loved my father. They told me that unlike other shopkeepers, he treated them like normal folks when they went to his store. He didn't look down on them".

Although his parents were not professionals in theater or had much money, notes Hiller, they enjoyed putting on a Jewish play once or twice a year for the Jewish community of 450 people, mainly to keep in touch with their heritage. Hiller recalls they started up the Yiddish theater when he was seven or eight years old; he helped set carpenters build and decorate the sets. When he was eleven, he got a role acting as an old man, wearing a long beard and the payot. He says that "the love of theater and music and literature my parents instilled in me" contributed to his later choosing to direct TV and films.

After he graduated from high school, he joined the Royal Canadian Air Force in 1941 during World War II. He served as a navigator on four-engine Handley Page Halifax heavy bombers on night missions over Nazi-controlled territory in Europe. After he returned from serving in the military, Hiller enrolled in and later graduated from University College, Toronto with a Bachelor of Arts degree in 1947. After Israel was declared a state in 1948, he and his wife unsuccessfully tried to join its army since it came under attack. He continued in college and received a Master of Arts degree in psychology in 1950. One of his first jobs after graduating was with Canadian radio directing various public affairs programs.

Directing career

Hiller began his career as a television director with the Canadian Broadcasting Corporation. NBC, one of the main networks in the United States, seeing his work in Canada, offered him positions directing television dramas. Over the next few years, his work for the small screen included episodes of Thriller, Alfred Hitchcock Presents, The Rifleman, Gunsmoke, Naked City, Perry Mason, and Playhouse 90.

1950s–1960s
Hiller directed his first film, The Careless Years (1957), the story of young couple eloping. This was followed by This Rugged Land (1962), originally made for television but then released as a film, and then Miracle of the White Stallions (1963), a Disney film. With these first films, Hiller already showed competence in directing unrelated subjects successfully.

He next directed a satirical anti-war comedy by screenwriter Paddy Chayefsky, The Americanization of Emily (1964), starring James Garner and Julie Andrews. It was the first of two film collaborations with Chayefsky. The film, nominated for two Academy Awards, would establish Hiller as a notable Hollywood director and, according to critics, "earned him a reputation for flair with sophisticated comedy." The New York Times critic Bosley Crowther wrote that Hiller's "brisk direction" of Chayefsky's script included some "remarkably good writing with some slashing irreverence."

In 1964 Hiller also directed the first episode of the television series The Addams Family. This was followed by the comedy Promise Her Anything (1965), with Warren Beatty and Leslie Caron and Penelope (1966), starring Natalie Wood. In a move away from comedy, he directed the desert warfare drama, Tobruk (1967), starring Rock Hudson and George Peppard, about a North African Campaign during World War II. The film was nominated for one Academy Award and showed Hiller capable of handling action films as well as comedy. Around the same time, he returned to comedy with The Tiger Makes Out (also 1967), starring Eli Wallach and Anne Jackson, and featured Dustin Hoffman's film debut. Popi (1969), recounts the tale of a Puerto Rican widower, starring Alan Arkin, struggling to raise his two young sons in the New York City neighborhood known as Spanish Harlem. Arkin was nominated for a Golden Globe Award for Best Actor.

1970s

Hiller directed Love Story (1970), his best known work and most successful at the box-office. The film stars Ryan O'Neal and Ali MacGraw in a romantic tragedy, and it was nominated for 7 Academy Awards including Best Director. The American Film Institute ranks it No. 9 in their list of the greatest love stories. Critic Roger Ebert disagreed with some critics who felt the story was too contrived: "Why shouldn't we get a little misty during a story about young lovers separated by death? Hiller earns our emotional response because of the way he's directed the movie [...] The movie is mostly about life, however, not death. And because Hiller makes the lovers into individuals, of course we're moved by the film's conclusion. Why not?"

The following year Hiller again collaborated with screenwriter Paddy Chayevsky in directing The Hospital (1971), a satire starring George C. Scott which has been described as being his best film. It is a black comedy about disillusionment and chaos within a hospital setting. Chayevsky received the Academy Award for Best Original Screenplay. In directing the film, Hiller tried to create a sense of action and movement by keeping the camera mobile and using handheld cameras as much as possible. His goal was to have the camera reflect the chaos and confusion taking place in the hospital. "I've always liked that sort of realistic feel," he states. "I wanted the feeling that the audience was peeking around the corner."

Hiller directed two comedy films in collaboration with playwright Neil Simon. The first film was The Out-of-Towners (1970), starring Jack Lemmon and Sandy Dennis, who were both nominated for Golden Globe awards for their roles. Their next collaboration was Plaza Suite (1971), starring Walter Matthau, which was nominated for the Golden Globe Award for Best Motion Picture. Both films were driven by intense comedy dialogue and were considered "crisply directed" by reviewers.

Hiller returned to directing serious drama with The Man in the Glass Booth (1975), starring Maximilian Schell, in a screen adaptation of a stage play written by Robert Shaw. Schell played the role of a man trying to deal with questions of self-identity and guilt as a survivor of the Holocaust during World War II. For his highly emotional role, Schell was nominated for the Academy Award for Best Actor and the Golden Globe Award.

Returning to comedy, Hiller directed Silver Streak (1976), starring Gene Wilder, Jill Clayburgh and
Richard Pryor. The film was well received by critics and is rated No. 95 on the AFI's best comedy films. He directed another comedy, The In-Laws (1979), with Peter Falk and Alan Arkin, which was also a critical and commercial success.

1980s

Hiller directed the film Making Love, which was released in February 1982, a story of a married man coming to terms with his homosexuality. Author! Author! (also 1982), starred Al Pacino. The following year Hiller directed Romantic Comedy (1983), starring Dudley Moore and Mary Steenburgen. His next comedy, The Lonely Guy (1984), starred Steve Martin as a greeting card writer and was followed by Teachers (1984), a comedy-drama film starring Nick Nolte.

Outrageous Fortune (1987) stars Shelley Long and Bette Midler. The film was successful at the box office, with Midler being nominated or winning various awards. The film was followed by See No Evil, Hear No Evil (1989), another comedy again starring Gene Wilder and Richard Pryor. Pryor plays a blind man and Wilder a deaf man who work together to thwart a trio of murderous thieves.

1990s
The 1990s saw Hiller directing a number of films, most of which received negative or mixed reviews: Taking Care of Business (1990); The Babe (1992), a biographical film about Babe Ruth, portrayed by John Goodman; Married to It (1993) and Carpool (1996). In 1997, Hiller helmed the infamous flop An Alan Smithee Film: Burn Hollywood Burn, which wound up living up to its title when Hiller requested his name be removed from the picture – thus truly making it an Alan Smithee film. Nine years later, when he was in his eighties, Hiller directed his last film, National Lampoon's Pucked (2006), starring rock star Jon Bon Jovi.

Influences
In an interview with journalist Robert K. Elder for The Film That Changed My Life, Hiller states that the film Rome, Open City (1945) had had a strong influence on his career because he saw it right after leaving the military where he was a bomber navigator in the Canadian Air Force. The film is set during the Nazi occupation of Italy and shows the priesthood and the Communists teaming up against the enemy forces. Hiller commented, "You just get the strongest emotional feelings about what happened to people in Italy."

Hiller preferred his scripts to contain "good moral values," a preference which he says came from his upbringing. He wanted high quality screenplays whenever possible, which partly explains why he collaborated on multiple films with both Paddy Chayefsky and Neil Simon. Hiller explains his rationale:

Awards and honors

Hiller served as President of the Directors Guild of America (DGA) from 1989 to 1993 DGA presented Hiller with the Robert B. Aldrich Award in 1999 and the DGA Honorary Life Member Award in 1993. In 1970 he received a DGA Award nomination for Outstanding Directorial Achievement in Feature Film for Love Story. He was also a member of the National Film Preservation Board of the Library of Congress from 1989 to 2005 and President of the Academy of Motion Picture Arts and Sciences from 1993 to 1997. He also served on the board of the National Student Film Institute.

He received the Jean Hersholt Humanitarian Award at the 2002 Academy Awards ceremony in recognition of his humanitarian, charitable and philanthropic efforts. In 2002, he was honoured with a star on Canada's Walk of Fame in Toronto. In 2006, he was made an Officer of the Order of Canada.  Writer and producer William Froug said that "Hiller is that rare and hugely successful gentleman who has remained humble all his life."

He received the Honorary Degree of Doctor of Fine Arts (DFA) from the University of Victoria in June 1995. He received the Honorary Degree of Doctor of Laws (LL.D) from the University of Toronto in November 1995.

Personal life and death
In 1948, he married Gwen Pechet, who was also Jewish; they had two children and two grandchildren. His wife died on June 24, 2016. They were married for 68 years. Hiller died almost two months later in Los Angeles on August 17, 2016, at the age of 92 from natural causes.

Filmography

The Careless Years (1957)
Miracle of the White Stallions (1963)
The Wheeler Dealers (1963)
The Americanization of Emily (1964)
Promise Her Anything (1965)
Penelope (1966)
Tobruk (1967)
The Tiger Makes Out (1967)
Popi (1969)
The Out-of-Towners (1970)
Love Story (1970), Best Director Oscar nomination
The Hospital (1971)
Plaza Suite (1971)
Man of La Mancha (1972)
The Crazy World of Julius Vrooder (1974)
The Man in the Glass Booth (1975)
Silver Streak (1976)

W. C. Fields and Me (1976)
Nightwing (1979)
The In-Laws (1979)
Making Love (1982)
Author! Author! (1982)
Romantic Comedy (1983)
The Lonely Guy (1984)
Teachers (1984)
Outrageous Fortune (1987)
See No Evil, Hear No Evil (1989)
Taking Care of Business (1990)
Married to It (1991)
The Babe (1992)
Carpool (1996)
An Alan Smithee Film: Burn Hollywood Burn (1997) (credited as Alan Smithee)
Pitch (1997) (as himself)
National Lampoon's Pucked (2006)

Notes

References

External links

Imagecollect.com

 Arthur Hiller (Aveleyman)

1923 births
2016 deaths
American film directors
American people of Polish-Jewish descent
American television directors
Best Director Golden Globe winners
Burials at Mount Sinai Memorial Park Cemetery
Canadian Broadcasting Corporation people
Canadian emigrants to the United States
Canadian people of Polish-Jewish descent
Canadian television directors
Film directors from Edmonton
Jean Hersholt Humanitarian Award winners
National Broadcasting Company
Officers of the Order of Canada
Presidents of the Academy of Motion Picture Arts and Sciences
Royal Canadian Air Force personnel of World War II
University of Toronto alumni
Victoria School of Performing and Visual Arts alumni
Jewish Canadian filmmakers
Comedy film directors